Adelaide is a single-member electoral district for the South Australian House of Assembly. The 22.8 km² state seat of Adelaide currently consists of the Adelaide city centre including North Adelaide and suburbs to the inner north and inner north east: Collinswood, Fitzroy, Gilberton, Medindie, Medindie Gardens, Ovingham, Thorngate, Walkerville, most of Prospect, and part of Nailsworth. The federal division of Adelaide covers the state seat of Adelaide and additional suburbs in each direction.

The electorate's name comes from the city which it encompasses, which is named after the British queen Adelaide of Saxe-Meiningen.

History
The six-seat multi-member electoral district of City of Adelaide existed from 1857 to 1862.

The four-member electoral district of Adelaide was created by the Constitution Act Amendment Act, 1901 for the 1902 election from the districts of East Adelaide, West Adelaide and North Adelaide; together with the three-member Port Adelaide and five-member Torrens, the three districts with a total of 12-members covered the whole of the metropolitan area in the 42 member house. The district had four members through to 1915.

Adelaide became a three-member district from the 1915 election, and then changed from a multi-member to single-member district upon the introduction of the Playmander from the 1938 election.

For most of the next half-century, the electorate was comfortably safe for the Labor Party.  A significant redistribution in 1983 saw the Labor two-party vote reduced from 66 percent to 47 percent, transforming it into a notional marginal Liberal electorate. However, Labor retained the seat at the 1985 election, albeit as the most marginal seat in parliament. Liberal Michael Armitage narrowly took the seat at the 1989 election – the first time that they or their predecessors, the Liberal and Country League, had won it in its single-member incarnation. The highest Liberal vote in Adelaide occurred at the landslide 1993 election, with the Liberal two-party vote rising to a safe 64.1 percent.  However, it once again became a marginal Liberal seat at the 1997 election.

After the redistribution ahead of the 2002 election made the electorate even more marginal, Armitage tried to transfer to the safer Liberal electorate of Bragg, but lost a preselection battle to Vickie Chapman.  Labor candidate Jane Lomax-Smith regained the seat for Labor at the 2002 election as a marginal seat, one of two gains that assisted Labor in forming government.  It became a safe Labor seat at the landslide 2006 election on a 60.2 percent two-party vote, before the Liberals won Adelaide for the second time at the 2010 election on a two-party swing of over 14 percent, turning it from safe Labor to marginal Liberal. Despite a −1.8 percent two-party swing, the Liberals retained Adelaide at the 2014 election on a 52.4 percent two-party vote.

The 2016 electoral redistribution added the rest of Collinswood to the electorate, and moved the electorate's northern boundary from Regency Road to several blocks south of Regency Road, removing a significant amount of northern Prospect. This increased the Liberal margin from 2.4 percent to an estimated 3.0 percent. The draft of the 2016 Redistribution Report had proposed moving the Liberal-voting suburbs of Walkerville and Gilberton to a neighbouring electorate, but Liberal incumbent Rachel Sanderson proceeded with a concerted campaign, organising the mass letter-box distribution of a pro forma document in the two suburbs, which aimed for residents to use the pro forma document to submit their objection to the commission. Of a record 130 total submissions received in response to the overall draft redistribution, over three-quarters (about 100) were from the two letter-boxed suburbs, Walkerville and Gilberton, which resulted in the proposal not appearing in the final redistribution.

Although Sanderson suffered a further 2.0 percent two-party swing, she narrowly retained Adelaide at the 2018 election with a 51.0 percent two-party vote. With the Liberals winning government after 16 years in opposition, Adelaide became the government's second most marginal seat, behind only King. The Greens achieved their highest vote in an electorate at the 2018 election in Adelaide.

Sanderson was defeated at the 2022 South Australian state election by Labor’s Lucy Hood.

Members for Adelaide

Election results

Notes

References
 ECSA profile for Adelaide: 2022
 ABC profile for Adelaide: 2018
 Poll Bludger profile for Adelaide: 2018

Electoral districts of South Australia
1938 establishments in Australia
Constituencies established in 1938